VMCC may refer to:
Vintage Motor Cycle Club, a motorcycle club 
Valley of the Moon Commute Club, a California bus service